The 2008–09 Etisalat Emirates Cup was the 1st staging of the Etisalat Emirates Cup running between October 10, 2008 and April 3, 2009. The competition was won by Al Ain defeating Al Wahda in the final 1–0. 12 clubs were drawn into 3 groups of 4 teams. The winners and the best runner up qualified for the semi final stage.

Group stage

Group A

Group B

Group C

Semi-finals
Kickoff times are in UAE Time (UTC+4).

1st Legs

2nd Legs

Final

External links 
 goalzz.com - Etisalat Emirates Cup 2008

UAE League Cup seasons
Etisalat Emirates Cup
2008–09 domestic association football cups